Aureimonas populi is a Gram-negative, facultative aerobic and motil bacteria from the genus of Aurantimonas which has been isolated from the bark of a poplar tree.

References

Hyphomicrobiales
Bacteria described in 2018